Anton Postupalenko (born 28 August 1988) is a retired professional Ukrainian football midfielder.

Career
Postupalenko is the product of the Metalist Youth School system where he joined the club's under-13 team. Myron Markevych promoted Selin to the senior team for the 2006–07 season. However, Anton continued to play most of his matches for the Metalist Reserves.

National team 
Postupalenko was an active member of the Ukraine national under-21 football team.

External links 
Official Website Profile
Profile on FootballSquads
 
 

1988 births
Living people
Footballers from Kharkiv
Ukrainian footballers
Association football midfielders
Ukrainian Premier League players
Ukrainian First League players
Ukrainian Second League players
Ukrainian expatriate footballers
Expatriate footballers in Belarus
Ukrainian expatriate sportspeople in Belarus
FC Metalist Kharkiv players
FC Metalist-2 Kharkiv players
FC Hoverla Uzhhorod players
FC Stal Alchevsk players
FC Metalurh Donetsk players
FC Stal Kamianske players
FC Olimpik Donetsk players
FC Torpedo-BelAZ Zhodino players
FC LNZ Cherkasy players
Kharkiv State College of Physical Culture 1 alumni
Ukraine youth international footballers
Ukraine under-21 international footballers